Peter Schultz may refer to:

Peter C. Schultz (born 1942), inventor of fiber optics
Peter G. Schultz (born 1956), chemist
Peter H. Schultz (born 1944), planetary geologist

See also
Peter Schulz (1930–2013), German politician
Peter Schulze (1935–2019), Australian politician